Trinity Street may be:

 Trinity Street, Cambridge, England
 Trinity Street, Southwark, London, England

See also 
 Trinity Lane, Cambridge, England